On July 17, 2020, by the Resolution of the Verkhovna Rada of Ukraine № 807-IX “On formation and liquidation of districts”, instead of 490 districts, 136 new districts with smaller powers were created, as the main powers of raions were passed to lower (hromadas) and higher (oblasts) levels.

This list does not include Chernobyl Raion which was abolished in 1988 and merged into Ivankiv Raion, about 2 years after the Chernobyl disaster took place.

Terminology

Overview

Raions of oblasts and the autonomous republic
There were 490 raions in 24 oblasts and the Crimea autonomous republic of Ukraine. The number of raions per region (oblast and autonomous republic) varies between 11 and over 20. The average population was 52,000.

The city municipalities of regional (oblast) significance (abbr. MOZ) had an independent of raion jurisdiction. The number of such cities (MOZ) varied from one region to another.

Each raion consisted of urban (towns) or rural (villages), smaller municipalities that were administrated by their local councils (selsoviet, silrada) and subordinated to raion's or city's administrations. They were the lowest level of administrative division.

Districts of cities

Some cities of oblast subordination along with the two cities of national significance (Kyiv and Sevastopol) are also divided in "city raions". "City raions" have their own local administration and are subordinated directly to a city. They may contain other cities, towns, and villages.

List of raions within each region
Note: region is a general term referring to oblasts, the republic and cities with special status. The population recorded in the table is listed in accordance to the latest census taken in the country, Ukrainian Census (2001). Asterisk (*) identifies raions with administrative centers located outside of them (usually separately incorporated).

I. Autonomous Republic of Crimea

II. Vinnytsia Oblast

III. Volyn Oblast

IV. Dnipropetrovsk Oblast

V. Donetsk Oblast

VI. Zhytomyr Oblast

VII. Zakarpattia Oblast

VIII. Zaporizhzhia Oblast

IX. Ivano-Frankivsk Oblast

X. Kyiv Oblast

XI. Kirovohrad Oblast

XII. Luhansk Oblast

XIII. Lviv Oblast

XIV. Mykolaiv Oblast

XV. Odesa Oblast

XVI. Poltava Oblast

XVII. Rivne Oblast

XVIII. Sumy Oblast

XIX. Ternopil Oblast

XX. Kharkiv Oblast

XXI. Kherson Oblast

XXII. Khmelnytskyi Oblast

XXIII. Cherkasy Oblast

XXIV. Chernivtsi Oblast

XXV. Chernihiv Oblast

XXVI. Kyiv

XXVII. Sevastopol

References

External links
 2001 Ukrainian census, Population Structure 
 Regions of Ukraine and its composition 

Raions of Ukraine
Raions